Donja Vidovska is a village in the municipality of Velika Kladuša, Bosnia and Herzegovina. The village is some 45 kilometres north of Bihać, the closest large urban settlement, and approximately 2 kilometres west and 10 kilometres south of border with Croatia.

Demographics 
According to the 2013 census, its population was 471.

References

Populated places in Velika Kladuša